Top Trumps: Doctor Who is a 2008 card game video game for the Nintendo DS, Nintendo Wii, Windows and PlayStation 2 consoles based on the Top Trumps card game and the BBC television series Doctor Who. It was published by Eidos Interactive. It is the first Doctor Who video game since 1997's Destiny of the Doctors.

The game is set in the Doctor Who universe and features characters from the Tenth Doctor and Ninth Doctor's adventures including the Tenth Doctor, Martha Jones, Capt Jack Harkness, Dalek, Cyberman and Slitheen from series 1 to series 3 of the new series in the animation style of the animated stories "The Infinite Quest" and "Scream of the Shalka".

A version was released for the Wii on 5 December 2008 in the UK.

Gameplay
Players each receive a deck of cards and attempt to win all of their opponent's cards. Each card features characters or events from the Doctor Who universe and has statistics which define its strengths and weaknesses. Players choose which of these statistics will be higher than their opponent's card, the winner keeps both cards and play continues.

The game features two modes: adventure mode, where the player competes against AI controlled opponents, and a versus mode where two players go head-to-head.

Reception
The game currently holds a 53 percent rating from Metacritic based on 6 reviews. Eurogamer gave it a 7/10 rating, saying it was nicely done with enough data to please fans of the TV show while having not mucked about with the classic Top Trumps gameplay. Pocket Gamer also awarded the game a 7/10 rating. They said it was "simple but engrossing, even for those who aren't avid followers of the Timelord's adventures."

References

External links

2008 video games
Nintendo DS games
PlayStation 2 games
Wii games
Windows games
Top Trumps
Eidos Interactive games
Video games based on Doctor Who
Tenth Doctor stories
Cybermen stories
J2ME games
Video games developed in the United Kingdom